This is a list of singles which have reached number one on the Irish Singles Chart in 1976.

18 Number Ones
Most weeks at No. 1 (artist): ABBA (17)
Most weeks at No. 1 (song): "Fernando" - ABBA, "Dancing Queen" - ABBA (6)
Most No. 1s: ABBA (3)

References

See also
1976 in music
Irish Singles Chart
List of artists who reached number one in Ireland

1976 in Irish music
Ireland Singles
1976